The Gapyeong Canada Monument is a monument erected to commemorate the sacrifice of the Canadian Forces during the Korean War, especially at the Battle of Kapyong in the Canadian Korean War Memorial Garden. The English text describing the monument reads as follows:

When one walks toward the monument, at the left is a panel explaining the history of the monument while at the right is a description of the Canadian contribution to the Korean War. The main monument is centred at the far end alongside both a Korean and Canadian flag. The main monument is flanked left by the monument dedicated to the 2nd Battalion Princess Patricia's Canadian Light Infantry (PPCLI) and the battle on Hill 677 and flanked on the right with another monument naming all the Canadian units that participated in the Korean War.

The Main monument 
The main monument was erected December 30, 1983 and its English text reads as follows:

PPCLI monument 
At the left of the main monument lies the monument dedicated to the 2nd Battalion of the Princess Patricia Canadian Light Infantry for their actions during the Battle of Kapyong on April 24 and 25 1951, actions that had them decorated with the United States Presidential Unit Citation. This monument was erected November 7, 1975.

Canadian contribution to the Korean War 
The two rightmost monument describe the Canadian contribution to the Korean war. The front monument reads as follows:

The rear monument goes into details, listing the units that participated in the Korean war as well as the size of the contribution: 26,791 Canadians during the war itself, 7,000 until 1955 with 516 casualties and 1,255 wounded. The units that served are:
 Royal Canadian Navy
 HMCS Athabaskan
 HMCS Cayuga
 HMCS Sioux
 HMCS Nootka
 HMCS Huron
 HMCS Iroquois
 HMCS Crusader
 HMCS Haida
 Army
 Lord Strathcona's Horse (Royal Canadians)
 2nd Field Regiment (FD Regt.) and 1st Regt. Royal Canadian Horse Artillery
 81st FD Regt. Royal Canadian Artillery
 The Corps of Royal Canadian Engineers
 The Royal Canadian Corps of Signals
 The Royal Canadian Regiment
 2nd. 1st and 3rd Battalions
 Princess Patricia's Canadian Light Infantry
 2nd. 1st and 3rd Battalions
 Royal 22e Régiment
 2nd. 1st and 3rd Battalions
 The Royal Canadian Army Service Corps
 The Royal Canadian Army Medical Corps
 The Royal Canadian Army Dental Corps
 Royal Canadian Army Ordnance Corps
 The Corps of Royal Canadian Electrical and Mechanical Engineers
 Royal Canadian Army Pay Corps
 The Royal Canadian Postal Corps
 Royal Canadian Army Chaplain Corps
 The Canadian Provost Corps
 Canadian Intelligence Corps
 Royal Canadian Air Force
 No. 426 (Thunderbird) Squadron

See also

 United Nations Memorial Cemetery – Busan, South Korea, which holds the remains of 378 Canadians killed in the Korean War

External links 

 Canada Monument
 A Profile of the Canadian Korean War Memorial
 International Expedition: South Korea

Korean War memorials and cemeteries
Monuments and memorials in South Korea
Canadian military memorials and cemeteries
Buildings and structures in Gapyeong County